is a Japanese announcer for Fuji Television.

Current programmes in charge
(As of 1 April 2017)

Irregular programmes in charge

Former programmes in charge

References

External links
 

Japanese announcers
Keio University alumni
People from Tokyo
1984 births
Living people